This is a list of Cleveland Browns players who were elected to the Pro Bowl.

The year indicates when the game was played, not the season that it followed.

1951–1995

The Cleveland Browns were inactive during the 1996, 1997, and 1998 NFL seasons.

1999–present
From the reactivation of the Browns franchise in 1999 to the present

Pro Bowlers
Lists of Pro Bowl selections by National Football League team
Pro Bowl selections